This article presents the awards and nominations of Australian film director, film producer and writer Peter Weir. Weir has won 30 awards from 42 nominations.

Academy Awards

British Academy Film Awards

Golden Globe Awards

Australian Academy of Cinema and Television Arts

Saturn Awards

Other Awards

External links

Weir, Peter